Saddle Peak is the name of several mountains:

Saddle Peak (Andaman Islands), the highest peak in India's Andaman and Nicobar chain
Saddle Peak National Park, Andaman Islands
Saddle Peak (Alaska)
Saddle Peak (Antarctica), in Victoria Land
Saddle Peak (California), in the Santa Monica Mountains
Saddle Peak, (Irish Hills, California) in San Luis Obispo County
Saddle Peak (Montana) in Gallatin County, Montana
Saddle Peak (Guadalupe), Nueva Leon MX, GPS:25 ° 37'40 "N 100 ° 14'21" O  /  25,627777777778, -100,23905388889
Saddle Peak (Oregon)
Saddle Peak (Washington)
Saddle Peak (Improvement District 9, Alberta Canada)
Saddle Peak Hills, California

See also
Saddle Mountain (disambiguation)